was a noted Japanese author. Onuma received his degree in English literature from Waseda University in 1942, and in 1958 became a Waseda professor in the Faculty of Letters. He received the 1969 Yomiuri Prize for Kaichūdokei and in 1989 was named a member of the Japan Art Academy.

References

Sources 
 Japanese Wikipedia article
 Jlit author information

Japanese writers
1918 births
1996 deaths
Yomiuri Prize winners